Phyllophaga tristis, the tristis complex, is a species of scarab beetle in the family Scarabaeidae.

Subspecies
These three subspecies belong to the species Phyllophaga tristis:
 Phyllophaga tristis amplicornis Reinhard, 1939
 Phyllophaga tristis suttonana Reinhard, 1939
 Phyllophaga tristis tristis (Fabricius, 1781)

References

Further reading

 

Melolonthinae
Articles created by Qbugbot
Beetles described in 1781